Chile competed at the 2017 World Games in Wroclaw, Poland, from July 20, 2017 to July 30, 2017.

Competitors

Fistball
On 22 November 2015 Chile had qualified at the 2017 World Games in the Fistball Men Team event.
On 29 November 2015 Chile has lost the quota.

References 

Nations at the 2017 World Games
2017 in Chilean sport
2017